Leptomyrina henningi, the Henning's black-eye, is a butterfly of the family Lycaenidae. It occurs in south-west Africa, Botswana and Zimbabwe. In South Africa, it occurs in Free State to Gauteng, Limpopo and North West.

Its wingspan measures 18.5–29 mm for males and 25–32 mm for females. Adults are on wing year round with peaks in November and March.

The larvae feed on Crassula alba and Cotyledon orbiculata.

References

Butterflies described in 1976
Hypolycaenini
Lepidoptera of Southern Africa